Rudi Louw (born 28 September 1985, in Windhoek) is a Namibian football midfielder currently playing for Black Africa.  He is a member of the Namibia national football team.
July 26: Pint-sized Brave Warriors midfielder and African Stars key player last season, Rudy Louw, has signed up for Black Africa, after spending three seasons with the double-league champions.

Career 
He holds 300 matches in the Namibia Premier League for different clubs, in which he has scored 88 goals to date.

International 
Louw played over 40 matches for the national junior teams in total on all levels and has turned out for the Brave Warriors five times and scored 15 goals.

External links
Rudi Louw profile - Civicsfc.com

1985 births
Living people
Footballers from Windhoek
Namibia international footballers
Association football midfielders
F.C. Civics Windhoek players
Ramblers F.C. players
Black Africa S.C. players
F.C. AK players
African Warriors F.C. players
Namibian men's footballers